Louisa Augusta Greville (1743 – c. 1779) was a British engraver.

Life and work
Louisa Greville was born in London in 1743. Her mother was Elizabeth Greville, Countess of Warwick, and her father was Francis Greville, 1st Earl of Warwick. In 1770 she married William Churchill. She produced engravings of works by Annibale Carracci, Salvator Rosa, Marco Ricci, among others. She was awarded prizes for her engravings by the Royal Society of Arts in 1758, 1759 and 1760.

Notable collections
Landscape with a horsedrawn sedan chair, 1759, Auckland Art Gallery

References

1743 births
1770s deaths
18th-century engravers
Women engravers
Artists from London
Daughters of British earls